Goran Grbović (born 9 February 1961) is a Serbian business manager and former professional basketball player. He is an executive director of the Štark Arena.

Playing career
Born in Kruševac, after finishing high school, he moved to Čačak. He started his career with KK Borac Čačak, where he was trained by the legendary Aleksandar Nikolić and Dragan Milošević - Gaga. He played for Partizan from 1980 until 1988, winning a national championship in 1981 and 1987 also a third-place finish in Euroleague in 1988. He ended his career after two successful seasons with Oximesa Granada.

He is also remembered as an idol of many Partizan fans, inspiring many children to play basketball.

Partizan
Grbović played in Partizan from 1980 until 1988, he won National championship in 1981 and 1987 and participated in Euroleague F4 in 1988.
That season, he scored the most points in hall Euroleague. He was also the best scorer of national championship in 1983 and 1984. He holds second place in club history by points in one play-off game, 44. He is seventh scorer in club history with 3889 points in 240 games, his average is 16.2 points.

National team career
Although he was qualified for the Yugoslav national team, he participated in only two competitions – EuroBasket tournaments in 1983 and 1987. He won a bronze medal in EuroBasket 1987 with the Yugoslav national team.

Player profile
Grbović was a very strong and attractive player, temperamental also. His nickname was "Tank". He was 2.02 m tall and played small forward. He had a good three-point shot and audiences liked his dunks.

Post-playing career 
In July 2018, he was named an executive director of the Štark Arena in Belgrade.

Achievements
 Yugoslav league champion: 2 (with Partizan: 1980–81 and 1986–87)

Individual achievements
 ACB League All Star participation: 1988
 Yugoslav championship best scorer: 1983, 1984.

References

External links
 Yugoslavian championship final
 Grbović about season 2008/2009
 Grbović at ACB.com
 " I don't hate Red Star"
 Grbović profile at fibaeurope.com

1961 births
Living people
Liga ACB players
KK Partizan players
KK Borac Čačak players
KK IMT Beograd players
Small forwards
Serbian expatriate basketball people in Spain
Sportspeople from Kruševac
Serbian men's basketball players
Yugoslav men's basketball players
Universiade medalists in basketball
Universiade gold medalists for Yugoslavia
Universiade silver medalists for Yugoslavia